The pat waing or pat wang is a drum circle instrument used in the Burmese folk musical ensemble (hsaing waing). This instrument has been adapted into the Thai piphat mon ensemble, where it is called poeng mang.

The player sits in the middle of a horseshoe-shaped shell made of elaborately carved wood and decorated with gold leaf. The 21 drums are played with the bare hands. Originally known as the saing waing because the drums were hung on eight carved wooden plunks in a circle, the instrument is now generally referred to as a pat waing.

See also
 Tabla tarang
 Poeng mang

References

 Burmese Encyclopedia, Vol. 4, P. 251 "Saing Saya" - printed in 1962

External links
Video

Burmese musical instruments
Membranophones
Pitched percussion instruments